Roger Bacon was a philosopher and friar.

Roger Bacon may also refer to:

Sir Roger Sewell Bacon (1895–1962), British judge and Chief Justice of Gibraltar
Roger Stuart Bacon (1926–2021), Canadian politician, former premier of Nova Scotia
Roger Bacon (physicist) (1926–2007), American physicist